Adrienne Gessner (23 July 1896 – 23 June 1987) was an Austrian actress. Gessner appeared in over fifty film and television shows during her career, including the 1955 costume film . Gessner appeared in a mixture of German and Austrian films during her career. Following the Anchluss of 1938 she fled with her Jewish husband Ernst Lothar to the United States, returning after the Second World War.

Filmography

References

Bibliography 
 Fritsche, Maria. Homemade Men In Postwar Austrian Cinema: Nationhood, Genre and Masculinity . Berghahn Books, 2013.
 Vansant, Jacqueline. Reclaiming Heimat: Trauma and Mourning in Memoirs by Jewish Austrian Reémigrés. Wayne State University Press, 2001.

External links 
 

1896 births
1987 deaths
Austrian film actresses
Austrian stage actresses
Emigrants from Austria after the Anschluss
20th-century Austrian actresses